Sybille Bödecker-Spindler (born 11 November 1948, in Dresden) is an East German retired slalom canoeist who competed in the early and mid-1970s. She finished 11th in the K-1 event at the 1972 Summer Olympics in Munich.

References
Sports-reference.com profile

1948 births
Sportspeople from Dresden
Canoeists at the 1972 Summer Olympics
East German female canoeists
Living people
Olympic canoeists of East Germany